This article provides details of international football games played by the Ghana national football team from 2020 to present.

Results

2020

2021

2022

Forthcoming fixtures 
The following will be scheduled:

References

2020s in Ghanaian sport
Ghana national football team results